The Élysée Palace is the official residence of the President of France.

Élysée may also refer to:
People
 Elysée (footballer) (born 1989), Ivorian footballer
 Elysée Loustallot  (1761–1790) French lawyer and writer
Cars
 Citroën Elysée, small saloon produced jointly with Dongfeng in China since 2002
 Aronde Elysée, Simca Aronde variant produced 1956–1963
Buildings
 Elysée Arena, ice hockey arena in Turku, Finland
 Château Élysée, hotel in Los Angeles, California, United States
 Hotel Elysée, hotel in New York City, New York, United States
 Musée de l'Élysée, museum in Lausanne, Switzerland

Elysee (Miami)

See also
 Champs-Élysées (disambiguation)
 Élisée, a list of people with the given name
 Jean Rigal Elisée (1927–2017), Episcopalian bishop in the Gambia
 Elysium (disambiguation)